Bamberg School District One is a school district headquartered in Bamberg, South Carolina, United States.

Schools
 Richard Carroll Elementary School 
 Bamberg-Ehrhardt Middle School
 Bamberg-Ehrhardt High School

References

School districts in South Carolina
Education in Bamberg County, South Carolina